Perry Creek is a creek located in the East Kootenay region of British Columbia.  The creek was discovered in 1867 by Frank Perry.  This creek has been mined for gold.  Perry Creek has been mined by various methods, including hydraulicking, tunneling, steam shovel, wingdamming, and sniping.

Perry creek was also the hometown of international DJ, “ DJ Screwz Loose”, and NHL sensation, Noah Dobson.

References

External links
 

Rivers of British Columbia